Thomas Eugene Creech (born September 9, 1950) is an American serial killer.

He was convicted of three murders committed between 1974 and 1975, and sentenced to death row in Idaho reduced on two years later appeal to life imprisonment. He was sent to Idaho's death row for a 1981 murder committed while imprisoned. Creech later confessed to a total of 42 murders in various states, some of which allegedly involved the Hells Angels and the Church of Satan. Most of his additional confessions are uncorroborated, but police believe strong evidence links Creech to seven additional murder victims. 

As of 2019, Creech was the longest-serving death row inmate in the state.

Early life
Thomas Eugene Creech was born on September 9, 1950 in Hamilton, Ohio. He grew up in an unstable household where his parents frequently argued with one another, eventually leading to a divorce. Creech was left to live with his father, who years later would die from unclear causes right in front of him. At that time, he claimed to have attacked the male nurse who had tended to his father.

The next few years of Creech's life are difficult to verify, as they are interwoven with hearsay and his own uncorroborated claims. From what little can be definitively confirmed, he ran away from his hometown and became a drifter, travelling frequently cross-country. On December 11, 1969, he was sentenced to a 2-to-50-years prison term for unarmed robbery. He was paroled in 1971. In 1973, he married 17-year-old Thomasine Loren White of Boise, Idaho, who allegedly became a participant in at least one of his murders. She was eventually moved to a psychiatric hospital in Salem, Oregon, where she subsequently committed suicide. In a letter that Creech sent to KIVI-TV decades after the fact, he claimed that his wife had been raped by a gang of men and then thrown out a window, causing her debilitating physical and mental injuries that were the primary contributors for her decision to end her life.

On August 22, 1973, he broke the conditions of his parole by allegedly stealing 13 cartons of cigarettes in Portland. The charges were dropped after he was admitted to a psychiatric hospital for a mental evaluation. Creech was housed in an open ward and was described as a model patient during his short stay, being released only a week later after it was determined that he did not suffer from any mental illnesses. He then moved back to Portland, where he found a job as a sexton for the St. Marks Episcopal Church. He later quit his job after the body of a man was found in his living quarters. Shortly thereafter, he and his new girlfriend, 17-year-old Carol Spaulding, would move to Idaho.

Idaho murders and arrest
On November 6, 1974, Creech and Spaulding were hitchhiking from Lewiston to Donnelly when a 1956-model Buick Century, operated by two house painters, 34-year-old Edward Thomas Arnold and 40-year-old John Wayne Bradford, picked them up. Along the way, Creech pulled out a rifle and shot both of them, before burying their bodies along Highway 55 near Cascade. Their bodies and blood-spattered car were found on the next day. In the meantime, Creech had befriended a 26-year-old named Gene Alvin Hilby, who later agreed to bury the rifle at his behest, unaware that it was a murder weapon.

Two days after the murders, after Creech was proposed as a suspect in two additional murders in Oregon and for supposedly sending death threats to the newly-elected Colorado senator Gary Hart, he and Spaulding were arrested in Glenns Ferry by police officer Bill Hill Friday, who had been notified that they were fugitives wanted for murder. While both of them were arraigned on murder charges, Creech was cleared of his supposed involvement with the death threats, as it was determined that it was just rumors that spread from a police officer, one of Hart's campaign managers and a prosecutor.

Trial and imprisonment
About a week after his arrest, Creech attempted to commit suicide by slashing his wrists with a broken piece of mirror, but managed only a minor injury before being restrained by prison guards and moved to another cell. Hilby, the man who had buried the supposed murder weapon and had originally also been charged with participating in the murder, was later released on probation after pleading guilty to hindering a murder case. In January 1975, it was decided that the now-18-year-old Spaulding would be tried as an adult for the two counts of first-degree murder.

Creech continued to cause trouble even after his arrest, as on June 16, 1975, he attacked and injured his cellmate William O. Fischer during an altercation. Fischer had to be driven to hospital to treat his facial injuries, but no further information is available about the incident itself due to a gag order being placed on the case. A month later, Creech attempted to sue the Idaho Statesman for supposedly violating his right to a fair trial by publishing information on other crimes he was either convicted or suspected of, thus possibly prejudicing the public against him. In August, shortly after a change of venue to Wallace was accepted, Creech was sent to the hospital after suffering injuries caused from falling out of his bunk bed and hitting his head. In October, it was ruled that an alleged confession, in which Creech, who initially had claimed was not near the murder site, says that he had shot and killed the two men after they pulled a knife on them and threatened to rape Spaulding, can be admitted as evidence in the upcoming trial.

Confessions
After his taking the stand at his trial, Creech shocked the entire nation when he readily admitted his responsibility in 42 murders in nearly a dozen states. He alleged the first murder occurred when he was 17 and drowned a friend in New Miami, Ohio. In his confession, Creech claimed he had killed a gay man in San Francisco in 1965, after running away from home, and later killed five people in Ohio in contract murders while he was with the Hells Angels, and later began killing people in Satanic rituals involving human sacrifices. In total, he claimed to know of such killings that had occurred in Burien, Washington; San Diego, San Francisco and Malibu, California; Beaver, Ogden and Salt Lake City, Utah; Tulsa, Oklahoma; Jackson Hole, Wyoming; Missoula, Montana; Wichita, Kansas and another city in Colorado. He also directed the authorities to two alleged burial grounds in Los Angeles County, where he claimed they could locate 100 victims, but the searches only turned up a cow bone.

While his confessions were shocking, authorities considered most of them to be bogus, with one officer saying that his recitation of the 'Satanic rites' had been copied word-for-word from an issue of Playboy. Nonetheless, they were able to link him to the murders of nine victims in total, none of which were killed in supposed "Satanic sacrifices": Gordon Lee Stanton and Charles Thomas Miller in Las Vegas, Nevada; 22-year-old William Joseph Dean, the man whose body was found in his church living quarters in Portland, Oregon; 19-year-old Salem store clerk Sandra Jane Ramsamoog, who was killed not long after Dean; 22-year-old Riogley Stewart McKenzie near Baggs, Wyoming and 50-year-old Vivian Grant Robinson in Sacramento, California. Among his credible victims was 70-year-old retiree Paul C. Schrader, who had been stabbed to death in an apparent robbery at the Downtown Motor Hotel in Tucson, Arizona on October 23, 1973. Creech, who at that time had found work as a cook in the El Bambi Cafe in Beaver, Utah, was later arrested for disorderly conduct and identified as the suspect after a routine police check revealed that he was wanted for Schrader's murder. Creech and Thomasine White were charged with the murder, but the pair was acquitted after only hours of deliberation.

While he was now considered a self-admitted serial killer, Creech continued to profess his innocence in the Arnold-Bradford murders. The jury took a few days of deliberations in order to return a guilty verdict to the case due to the confusing circumstances. His attorney, with the assistance of private investigator John Wickersham, sought to interview additional witnesses in order to have the conviction overturned. On March 25, 1976, Creech was sentenced to death by hanging for the two murders. His execution was stayed pending appeals, with Creech willingly offering to stand trial for some of his killings in Oregon and California. He would later be convicted of these killings, but his exact sentence is unknown.

Prison murder and new sentence
As a result of the 1976 Supreme Court rulingGregg v. Georgia (which led to changes in death penalty sentencing), one of Creech's attorneys, Bruce Robinson, sought to have his client's sentence overturned and resentenced to life imprisonment, citing that it violated the state's now-illegitimate death penalty statute. Robinson's strategy proved to be a success, as Creech's sentence was later commuted and he was indeed resentenced to life imprisonment. Robinson additionally petitioned for Creech to be freed altogether, but was unsuccessful in doing so.

Creech was housed at the Idaho Maximum Security Institution in Kuna, where he worked as a janitor, despite the protests of two prosecutors, who warned the wardens that he still posed a threat, even to other inmates. Their fears were realized on May 13, 1981, when 23-year-old David Dale Jensen, a car thief who had previous altercations with Creech, attempted to attack Creech with a sock stuffed with a battery. During the scuffle, Creech managed to take hold of the sock and started beating Jensen with it, repeatedly bashing and kicking his head and causing Jensen's death. He was quickly tried, convicted and sentenced to death, asking the victim's father for forgiveness and stating his wish was to be executed, as he did not want to die in solitary confinement.

Current status
Since his second death sentence, Creech has been housed on Idaho's death row, where he is also the longest-serving inmate. One of the prosecutors at his original trial, Jim Harris, later told in an interview that he now preferred him to be taken off death row, as he considered that his case had cost the taxpayers too much for an execution that possibly may never come. In 2020, Creech and another death row inmate, Gerald Pizzuto, filed a federal lawsuit in which they claimed their rights were violated by the state's secrecy surrounding the execution protocol. The lawsuit was thrown out by Judge David Nye, citing their ongoing appeals as a prime factor of why it has no current standing.

See also
 Capital punishment in Idaho
 List of death row inmates in Idaho
 List of longest prison sentences served
 List of serial killers in the United States

External links
 A. J. Arave v. Thomas E. Creech (1992)
 Creech v. State (2002)
 Creech v. Hardison (2010)

References

1950 births
20th-century American criminals
American male criminals
American people convicted of murder
American prisoners sentenced to death
American prisoners sentenced to life imprisonment
American serial killers
Criminals from Ohio
Living people
Male serial killers
People convicted of murder by California
People convicted of murder by Idaho
People convicted of murder by Oregon
People from Hamilton, Ohio
Prisoners sentenced to death by Idaho
Prisoners sentenced to life imprisonment by Idaho
Satanism in the United States